Hypsioma dejeanii is a species of beetle in the family Cerambycidae. It was described by James Thomson in 1868. It is found in Brazil.

References

dejeanii
Beetles described in 1868